The Orkestra Melayu Singapura is an orchestra based in Singapore which specialises in promoting and preserving traditional Malay music. It was founded in 1991 and performs on both western instruments and traditional Malay instruments. It also has a gamelan ensemble, founded in 2001, and an associated youth orchestra.

Music director since January 2009
 Amri Amin

Conductors
Jais Minsawi (conductor since 1995)
Mokhtar Abdullah (conductor emeritus 1991 to 1995)
Benjamin Zander (guest conductor, August 2000)

References
  National Library Board Singapore 2004

External links
Orkestra Melayu Singapura - Official website
Jais Minsawi - resident conductor

Singaporean orchestras